The Living Human Project (LHP) is a project that begun in 2002 to develop a distributed repository of anatomo-functional data and simulation algorithms for the human musculoskeletal apparatus used to create the physiome of the human musculoskeletal system. In 2006 the BEL was merged with Biomed Town, an Internet community for those who have a professional interest in biomedical research.

Living Human Digital Library
The LHDL project was ended in January 2009, and soon after the LHDL consortium released a biomedical data management and sharing service called Physiome Space. Physiome Space lets individual researchers as well as for large consortia to share with their peers large collections of biomedical data, including medical imaging and computer simulations.

See also 
 List of omics topics in biology
 Virtual Physiological Human
 Physiomics
 Physiome
 Physiology
 EuroPhysiome
 Human anatomy

References 

 Viceconti, M., Taddei, F., Petrone, M., Galizia, S., Jan, S. V. S., and Clapworthy, G., 2006, "Towards the Virtual Physiological Human: the Living Human Project," The 7th International Symposium on Computer Methods in Biomechanics and Biomedical Engineering (CMBBE 2006), Antibes Côte d’Azur, France.
 Viceconti, M., Taddei, F., Montanari, L., Testi, D., Leardini, A., Clapworthy, G., and Van Sint Jan, S., 2007, "Multimod Data Manager: A tool for data fusion," Computer Methods and Programs in Biomedicine, 87(2), pp. 148–159.
 Viceconti, M., Taddei, F., Van Sint Jan, S., Leardini, A., Clapworthy, G., Galizia, S., and Quadrani, P., 2007, "Towards the multiscale modelling of musculoskeletal system," Bioengineering Modeling and Computer Simulation, Barcelona, Spain.
 Viceconti, M., Zannoni, C., Testi, D., Petrone, M., Perticoni, S., Quadrani, P., Taddei, F., Imboden, S., and Clapworthy, G., 2007, "The multimod application framework: A rapid application development tool for computer aided medicine," Computer Methods and Programs in Biomedicine, 85(2), pp. 138–151.
 Viceconti, M., Taddei, F., Van Sint Jan, S., Leardini, A., Cristofolini, L., Stea, S., Baruffaldi, F., and Baleani, M., 2008, "Multiscale modelling of the skeleton for the prediction of the risk of fracture," Clinical biomechanics (Bristol, Avon).
 Zhao, X., Liu, E., and Clapworthy, G., 2008, "Service-Oriented Digital Libraries: A Web Services Approach," Internet and Web Applications and Services, 2008. ICIW'08. Third International Conference on, pp. 608–613.

Physiology
Online databases
Anatomical simulation